CBS7 may refer to:

Briercrest South Airport, the ICAO code for the airport in Canada

CBS affiliates
KOSA-TV (Midland/Odessa, Texas)
WSPA-TV (Asheville, North Carolina/Greenville, South Carolina)
KIRO-TV (Seattle)
WHIO-TV (Dayton, Ohio)
WSAW-TV (Wausau, Wisconsin)
WWNY-TV (Watertown, New York)